Raymond Isaacs (6 October 1928 – 19 June 2002), who performed as Ray Martine, was a British comedian, especially on television in the 1960s and early 1970s.

Life and career
He was born to Jewish parents in London, and underwent national service in the RAF before spending time in the United States, where he heard the patter and one-liners of American comedians.  On returning to England, he worked in the clothing trade, and performed as an amateur comedian in London pubs in the late 1950s and early 1960s.   His style was "waspish...[and]  uncompromising about problems he had faced arising from his sexuality and Jewishness".   He was spotted by television journalist Daniel Farson, who booked him to appear in the East End pub he owned, the Waterman's Arms, alongside performers Rex Jameson (Mrs Shufflewick) and Queenie Watts.

As a result, Martine was recruited to host the ATV variety show, Stars and Garters, initially set in Farson's pub but soon moved to a studio set.   The show started in 1963, and featured singers such as Vince Hill, Kathy Kirby, and Clinton Ford.  Helped by jokes written by Dick Vosburgh and Marty Feldman, Martine became popular, and recorded a comedy LP,  East End, West End, recorded at a pub in Hackney and at the Establishment Club in Soho, in 1964.

He was dropped before the third series of Stars and Garters in late 1965, and appeared as a taxi driver in The Avengers in 1966 (the episode "The Girl From Auntie").    His television success led to bookings in workingmens clubs in the north of England, where he started to base himself.  He reappeared on British television in 1969, as a panel member in the comedy panel show Jokers Wild, hosted by Barry Cryer and also featuring Les Dawson, Arthur Askey and Ted Ray.  His appearances on the show were described as "lively and unpredictable... [and sometimes] overpoweringly disruptive."  Martine appeared in most episodes of the show up to 1972, when he left.

Martine continued for some years to perform in clubs in the north of England, and also undertook after dinner speaking.  By the 1990s, he was reportedly involved in the antiques business in Newcastle.  He died in a nursing home in Newcastle in 2002, aged 73.

References

1928 births
2002 deaths
20th-century English comedians
English male comedians
Gay entertainers
20th-century English LGBT people